Samuel or Sam Simpson may refer to:

 Sam Simpson (footballer) (born 1998), Australian rules footballer for Geelong
 Sam Simpson (gymnast) (born 1984), Australian gymnast
 Samuel L. Simpson (1845–1899), American poet